Viktoriia Volodymyrivna Us (born 29 April 1993) is a Ukrainian slalom canoeist who has competed at the international level since 2008.

She finished in 12th place in the K1 event at the 2016 Summer Olympics in Rio de Janeiro. She recorded her 2nd Olympic participation at the 2020 Summer Olympics in Tokyo where she started in both women's events. She finished 8th in the K1 event and 7th in the C1 event.

She won silver in the C1 event at the 2013 World U23 Championships in Liptovský Mikuláš and a bronze in the K1 event at the 2015 European U23 Championships in Kraków.

World Cup individual podiums

References

External links

1993 births
Living people
Ukrainian female canoeists
Olympic canoeists of Ukraine
Canoeists at the 2016 Summer Olympics
Sportspeople from Kyiv
Canoeists at the 2020 Summer Olympics